NBHS may refer to schools named:

In Canada:
 New Brunswick Historical Society, Saint John, New Brunswick

In Scotland:
 North Berwick High School, East Lothian

In England:
 North Bromsgrove High School, Worcestershire

In Australia:
 Newcastle Boys' High School, New South Wales
 Normanhurst Boys' High School, New South Wales

In New Zealand:
 Napier Boys' High School, Hawke's Bay

In the United States:
 Needham B. Broughton High School, North Carolina
 New Bedford High School, Massachusetts
 New Beginnings High School, Indiana
 New Braunfels High School, Texas
 New Britain High School, Connecticut
 New Brunswick High School, New Jersey
 North Bend High School (Oregon), Oregon
 North Bergen High School, New Jersey
 North Brookfield High School, Massachusetts
 North Buncombe High School, North Carolina
 North Babylon High School, New York